Dead Frog with Flies is a 1630 oil on copper painting by Dutch artist Ambrosius Bosschaert II. It represents a dead frog, lying on her back on a marble surface, which starts to attract several flies.

See also
 Frogs in culture

References

1630 paintings
Dutch paintings